The Boonton Iron Works were founded about 1770 by Samuel Ogden who, with others in his family, purchased a  tract along the Rockaway River, near present-day Boonton, New Jersey. Here rolling and slitting mills were erected that engaged in the manufacture of nail rods and bar iron. With the construction of the Morris Canal in 1830, the New Jersey Iron Company was organized. This company built a new plant costing $283,000 and imported skilled mechanics from England. Under Fuller & Lord (1852–1876) the enterprise become an integrated industry with ore and timber reserves, canal boats, furnaces, mills and auxiliary plants. After 1881, the business slowly declined. The plant closed in 1911.

Sources
James Truslow Adams, Dictionary of American History (New York: Charles Scribner's Sons, 1940).

See also 
Blast furnace
David Thomas (industrialist)

External links
Abandoned Iron Mines of the NJ Highlands

Buildings and structures in Morris County, New Jersey
Ironworks and steel mills in the United States
Ruins in the United States
Economic history of New Jersey
Industrial buildings and structures in New Jersey
Companies established in 1770
1770 establishments in New Jersey
Pre-statehood history of New Jersey
1911 disestablishments in New Jersey